Suruli Manohar was a Tamil film actor comedian who appeared in many films and television serials. He also had directed a film Iyakkunar as well. He is known for his roles in Sura, Padikkadavan and many other movies.

Partial filmography

Films

Television

Death
He had had cancer and was getting treatment for quite sometime. He got admitted in a hospital few months before to treat the disease but unfortunately his life could not be saved. He died on 7 August 2014. He is survived by his wife Pachaiamma and three daughters.

References

Tamil comedians
2014 deaths
Year of birth missing
Male actors from Chennai
Place of birth missing
Date of birth missing
Indian male comedians